The Masks of Time is a science fiction novel by American author Robert Silverberg, first published in 1968.  It was a nominee for the Nebula Award in 1968.

It was published in the United Kingdom under the title Vornan-19.

Plot summary
Vornan-19 arrives on Christmas Day, 1998 in Rome.  He floats down from the sky naked, landing on the Spanish Steps. The police try to arrest him but he knocks them over with a touch.  He is helped and given clothes by Horst Klein who believes that the apocalypse will come in 389 days. Vornan-19 tells him that he is from the year 2999.  Jack Bryant, a graduate student under Leo Garfield at the University of California is working toward a process to extract huge amounts of energy from ordinary matter.  He leaves the physics department, marries pretty blonde named Shirley and they move to the deserts of Arizona.  Leo Garfield spends several months with Jack and Shirley to get a break from his physics work.  During Vornan-19's first public press conference he mentions the fact that in the future society is very different because they have tapped the energy within all matter so that no one has to work to obtain energy.  Leo Garfield tells Jack that he left the University because he had actually finished his thesis showing how to extract the enormous amounts of energy within all particles of matter.  He could not bear to release this theory since it would dramatically change human society.  He asks Jack to use his influence to question Vornan-19 on the subject to see if it was his theory that was used in the future.  When Jack returns to the University, he has a call from the White House and is forced to join a group of scientists working for the US government on how to best deal with Vornan-19.  Vornan-19 comes to New York City where he meets with the group of scientists, attends an outrageous house party and tours the New York Stock Exchange.  He reveals during the tour that in 2999 there is no capitalism and even no money.  All citizens have all that they need.  After visiting the stock market Vornan requests a visit to an automated brothel in Chicago.  During an interview in California, Vornan-19 says that in the future they have determined how life began on the earth.  An alien spacecraft visited the earth long ago on a scouting mission and discovered no life forms and so departed; but before they left they jettisoned a load of their garbage that landed on earth and eventually started life.  Vornan then goes to the moon, and when he returns he takes a break from his tour of the earth by staying with Leo's friends Jack and Shirley in Arizona.  Shirley subtly offers herself to Vornan but he shows no interest, Vornan instead seduces Jack.  Shirley then sleeps with Leo who has been wanting her for years.  Vornan has been made into a messiah by the people of earth.  He visits Buenos Aires using a personal shield technology that should allow him to interact with the crowds.  The shield fails and Vornan is grabbed by the crowd and his body is never recovered.  Leo remains in Buenos Aires until the turn of the century.

Characters
 Vornan-19 — man from the future, specifically 2999.
 Leo Garfield — Physics professor at the University of California, specializing in the time-reversal of subatomic particles.
 Horst Klein — a nineteen-year-old German, the first person to talk to Vornan-19.
 Jack Byrant — A graduate student under Leo Garfield.
 Sanford Kralick — Presidential aide who put together the Vornan-19 committee
 Marcus Ketthridge — Special Assistant to the President
 F. Richard Heyman — Historian on the Vornan-19 committee
 Helen McIlwain — Anthropologist on the Vornan-19 committee
 Morton Fields — Psychologist on the Vornan-19 committee
 Lloyd Kolff — Philologist on the Vornan-19 committee
 Aster Mikkelsen — Biochemist on the Vornan-19 committee

Major themes
The Masks of Time has been described as an ironic and satiric treatment of the theme of salvation.

Literary significance and reception
The Masks of Time has been described as "a brilliant and nearly flawless performance", and has been compared to Robert A. Heinlein's Stranger in a Strange Land. The story of Vornan-19 has been described as a realistic and ironic parody of the romantic and superhuman adventures of Valentine Michael Smith. Algis Budrys cited "gratuitous problems", but recommended readers to "go buy it. It's quite interesting".

References

External links
 The Masks of Time on Worlds Without End

1968 American novels
1968 science fiction novels
American science fiction novels
Ballantine Books books
Fiction set in 1998
Novels about time travel
Novels by Robert Silverberg